Prague was the first city in Czechoslovakia to introduce modern trolleybuses. Only a few other trolleybus systems existed previously in the Czech landsin České Velenice (Gmünd) and České Budějoviceusing the same overhead system as the Electromote, the predecessor of all trolleybuses.

Trolleybuses operated in Prague during two separate periods. The first trolleybus system was opened in 1936 and it lasted until 1972, when it was closed. After precisely 45 years, a new trolleybus system was opened in Prague in 2017.

Existing network 
At present, no trolleybus lines are in operation in Prague. However, 14 lines are in preparation and the first one should start regular operation early in 2023, with testing expected to start at the end of 2022. Remaining should follow afterwards. Other lines are being discussed as well, but have not been approved yet.

1) This is an approximate number. Very short sections near the Na Knížecí terminal will not be wired. This line has three variants: on the shortest one most of the track is going to be covered with wires, but on the longest one that will be only about 25%. However, with the addition of lines covering area in between Nové Butovice and Velká Ohrada, the wired percentage will rise considerably for the longest variant of this line.

History

First system 
The first system was opened on 28 September 1936 with a 3.5 km-long line. After World War II, the system expanded rapidly, and trolleybuses appeared in the city center, as well as in the suburban areas and big housing developments. The network reached its maximum length of 56.876 km in March 1959. However, by 1959, the first and oldest trolleybus line had already closed. Most sections which were under construction at that time were not finished, and those in operation were slowly replaced with diesel buses.

After 1960, no new trolleybuses were purchased  and vehicles started becoming obsolete. Many streets were being reconstructed, there was not enough electricity available to run the network, and diesel fuel was inexpensive, which all contributed to the decision to begin replacing trolleybuses with buses, leading ultimately to the final closure of the Prague trolleybus system on 16 October 1972.

Fleet 
In 1936, the following Czech-made vehicles started operating on the Prague trolleybus system:
 Škoda 1Tr (1 prototype)
 Tatra T 86 (1 prototype + 5)
 Praga TOT (1 prototype + 11)

In 1938 and 1939, two Škoda 2Tr trolleybuses were delivered.

A Tatra T400 began operating in Prague in 1948. In total, there were 136 new vehicles of that type, as well as eight second-hand vehicles from Most, purchased and running in Prague. New vehicles were supplied in various series up to 1955, based on the previous experience with the vehicles, as well as to utilize new technology.

In 1958, a prototype of the Tatra T401 model was added to Prague's trolleybus fleet but it only lasted three years in operation. The performance and features of the Tatra T401 were tested during the first two years of operation, after which it was decided that the Škoda Works, which produced smaller trolleybuses, would take over all trolleybus production in Czechoslovakia, and the Tatra company stopped producing trolleybuses.

Finally, in 1960, the last 35 Škoda 8Tr trolleybuses were purchased for Prague.

Tatra T400 and Škoda 8Tr vehicles were running in the city until the end of trolleybus operation in 1972.

Attempts to re-open the system in the 1980s and early 1990s 
Plans to restore trolleybus network in Prague started appearing in 1979. Soon after the political revolution of 1989, Prague's public transport company even delegated money and people to look into the reinstatement of the trolleybus network. A prototype of a new trolleybus model, the Škoda 17Tr, was developed and produced in Prague. After 1992, however, all plans to restore the network were dropped.

Second system 
After precisely 45 years, on 15 October 2017, a new trolleybus line was opened in Prague. The system was equipped with overhead wires along less than 1 km of the route's length and required trolleybuses with additional batteries, capable of operating away from the wires, along other parts of the route. The goal of that experimental project was to prove the viability of trolleybuses in Prague, as well as demonstrating how to minimize the cost of building the infrastructure. Overhead wires have been installed along Prosecká Street, which features a steep gradient. That will prevent a fast battery drain for vehicles running uphill as well as charging their batteries for the rest of their journey outside of the wired portion of the route. In winter, the overhead power supply also allowed for a tank of water to be heated for interior heating.

Prior to constructing a new trolleybus network, Prague's public transport company had been trying out battery-powered buses on various routes. Starting in 2014, the tests revealed that battery-powered vehicles tended to be very problematic on steep hills typical of Prague's landscape. The idea of a trolleybus network came as a direct response to the major problems with the battery-powered vehicles, aiming to combine the best attributes of both worlds.

The testing period was to take about a year, and once finished it was hoped that the network would be extended and new articulated trolleybuses with additional batteries purchased.

The first vehicle to operate on the line was a Czech-made SOR TNB 12 AcuMario, but it was a prototype, as it was the first vehicle to be equipped with additional batteries.

Opening ceremony 
To commemorate 45 years since the last trolleybus operated in Prague, as well as the opening of the new line, apublic event was held on 15 October 2017, in which the new SOR TNB 12 trolleybus was used. It was accompanied by a new SOR ENS 12 electric bus and an historic Tatra T400 vehicle from the Prague's public transport museum collection. Spectators could see all three vehicles in operation, as well as take a free ride.

Regular operation 
On 1 July, Prague's Public Transport Company was to begin regular operation on a newly built line. The line will continue to have the number 58 and will follow the same route as in the preceding testing stage, that is, in between metro stations Palmovka and Letňany. Initially only 1 vehicle Škoda 30 Tr will be operated on the line running at 60-minute intervals.

One year of operation anniversary 

On 14 October 2018, a second event since the opening of the new trolleybus system was organised. It took place in order to commemorate both the 46th anniversary of the trolleybus system shutdown in Prague, as well as to celebrate the anniversary of the current system. Unlike the opening ceremony in 2017, rides on an historic vehicle were not continuous but took take only five times. Visitors who wanted to take a ride also needed to purchase tickets when entering the vehicle. Each trip cost 35 CZK per person, but small children were free if accompanied by an adult. The historic vehicle was a smaller Škoda 8Tr, and only about 40 people were allowed to travel at a time. Every paying passenger was given a stamped paper ticket, and a postcard with a picture of Škoda 8Tr when it was still in regular operation.

Each ride started at the bottom of the hill, near the Kundratka stop, right at the beginning of the wired section, then took approximately a kilometre up the hill. Passengers were required to leave the vehicle at the Kelerka stop at the end of the wired section. The trolleybus was then towed using a tractor all the way to Letňany roundabout, supposedly the nearest safe place to turn the towed trolleybus, and back to the Kelerka stop to take passengers back to the bottom section of the line at the Kundratka stop. Škoda 8Tr was then towed again to allow for a new ride up. Every round trip took approximately 20 minutes, but only a small portion of it consisted of the actual ride, with about 15 minutes being required for the off-wire manoeuvres. People who didn't take the ride stood around the wired section to have a look and take photos and videos of the running attraction.

Fleet

Initial stage testing results 
On 11 April 2021, Prague's public transport company announced the extension of the existing 1km-long wired network. The plan war to replace all buses on line 140 connecting stations Palmovka and Miškovice by 2021. That was later delayed by one year to 2022. The final wired network won't cover the whole line but only a selected sections which is why Prague's public transport company now inquires 15 articulated trolleybuses equipped with batteries.

Based on the results from the testing done in between October 2017 and April 2018, it was also requested the new buses to operate the route 140 should be able to charge their batteries faster, thet they should have a better acceleration running off wires on steep hills, and they should also be able to charge statically in depots.

Electrification of the Palmovka - Čakovice section 
On 17 October 2018, the newspaper Pražský deník published an article on the current state of the trolleybus network extension plans mentioned in Initial stage testing results above. It was expected the wired sections would be built in 2020-21 and construction would take approximately 12 months. Approximately half of the bus line 140 was projected to be wired (8 Km).

However a construction permit was only issued at the end of February 2021 so the work on the line (two individual sections) began on 10 January 2022, which has been merged with a reconstruction of Prosecká Street in the first quarter of 2021 as well as bus stop reconstructions on Tupolevova street slightly later that year.

Overall, three substations will be provided to enable operations on the line, two to power the line itself and one for static vehicle charging in the Klíčov depot. Interestingly, a substation in Letňany is an abandoned substation originally used by trolleybuses. The other one had already been built during the initial testing and is being upgraded to allow full operation. So in the end the only new substation is built right for the operation of line 58 is the one in Klíčov depot.

Decision on Nádraží Veleslavín - Airport section electrification 
On 16 September 2019, information was released about three new lines to be run by trolleybuses with additional batteries, on the other side of Prague (left bank of the Vltava river), utilizing a different depot in Řepy district. Work should start on electrifying bus line 119 connecting Prague with its main airport. Included should be charging station in Řepy depot (also usable for subsequent lines), in the Veleslavín subway/train/bus interchange station, and another at the Prague's International Airport, plus 4.8km-long section with overhead wires between Veleslavín and intermediate bus stop Terminal 3.

Two other routes, 131 and 191, should follow once the work on the airport line is finished in 2023.

Line 119 is to be operated by high-capacity double-articulated trolleybuses, with higher capacity than current regular articulated buses. In total, 20 trolleybuses are supposed to be purchased for line 119, costing around 600 million CZK, while the wiring and depot preparation should only take half the sum.

Decision on replacing bus routes 131, 137, 176 and 191 with trolleybus routes
On 8 June 2020, Prague City Council approved electrification of lines 131, 137, 176 and 191. The construction of the necessary infrastructure should begin after lines 140 (Palmovka - Čakovice) and 119 (Nádraží Veleslavín - Airport) are finished, as was announced when line 119 was approved. This project is a logical step to follow after the conversion of line 119 considering line 191 can use part of that infrastructure. On top of that line 176 will also share a section of the catenary with line 191. Then all the additional lines will be built close to each other on the same bank of the Vltava river which also means a single depot will be able to serve them all and some power substations can power up multiple nearby sections. In addition all 4 lines are passing through steep and/or long inclines which are well suited for a trolleybus operation. It is also interesting all lines except 191 were already operated by trolleybuses in the Prague's first trolleybus system epoch. Price to electrify the 4 new trolleybus lines is estimated to be in between 1 to 1.3 billion CZK in total.

As with the preceding projects, the trolleybuses on these routes will operate partially under wires and partially using batteries:

 Line 131 (Bořislavka – Hradčanská), catenary to be installed on 61 % of the route (3.8 km).
 This line should cost around 200 million CZK.
 Line 137 (Na Knížecí – U Waltrovky), catenary to be installed on 95 % of the route (3.2 km). However, some buses continue from U Waltrovky up to a quite distant stop Malá Ohrada.
 This line should cost around 220 million CZK.
 Line 176 (Stadion Strahov – Karlovo náměstí), catenary to be installed on 71 % of the route (4 km). This line will share some infrastructure with line 119.
 This line should cost around 320 million CZK.
 Line 191 (Na Knížecí – Ciolkovského – Letiště Václava Havla Praha), catenary will be installed in three separate sections (also utilizing infrastructure for line 119). The total coverage of wired power supply should be 55% of the route (15.3 km).
 This line should cost around 580 million CZK.

An additional 130 million CZK will be used to prepare the Řepy depot for trolleybus expansion. Thayt construction should be completed by 2025.

Future outlook 
Even though the current trolleybus network is small, if testing is successful it could begin to grow in the next few years. Trolleybuses have strong support from within the public transport company, city major as well as public based on being both clean and efficient. The wired section of the current trolleybus system, while not covering the full length of the line, helps recharge batteries while the vehicle is in operation, which reduces the need for heavier high-capacity batteries. Therefore, less energy is consumed and batteries can occupy much less space in the vehicle. That is also the reason for the wired section of the trolleybus system being on the steep, hilly section, where battery consumption is enormous in comparison to operation on flat ground.

References

External links

Prague
Prague
Public transport in Prague
1936 establishments in Czechoslovakia
1972 disestablishments in Czechoslovakia

2017 establishments in the Czech Republic